Bernie Sanders presidential campaign may refer to:

 Bernie Sanders 2016 presidential campaign
 Bernie Sanders 2020 presidential campaign